Marian Șotărcă (born 12 November 1980), is a Romanian futsal player who plays for Andorra and the Romanian national futsal team.

References

External links
UEFA profile

1980 births
Living people
Romanian men's futsal players